Webster is a ghost town in Riley Township, Putnam County, Ohio, United States.

History
Webster was not officially platted, but once contained a post office under the name Stanley. This post office was established in 1863, and remained in operation until 1891.

References

Geography of Putnam County, Ohio
Ghost towns in Ohio